Fort Laughlin was a Civil War redoubt, built in 1863 for the defense of Pittsburgh by the employees of Jones and Laughlin Iron Works, and named for James H. Laughlin. It was also known as Fort McKinley or Fort Ormsby. It was a circular earthwork on Ormsby's Hill, now part of Arlington Park on Arlington Avenue.

History
Built along the bluffs of the Monongahela River in Pittsburgh, Pennsylvania in 1863 by Jones and Laughlin Iron Works in response to the threatened invasion of Pennsylvania by the Confederate States Army, this circular, earthen, Civil War redoubt was also known as "Fort McKinley" or "Fort Ormsby." It was located on Ormsby's Hill in what is now Arlington Park, which is located on Arlington Avenue and is bordered by Fernleaf, Salisbury, Sterling, and Fort Hill streets.

No remains of the structure were evident as of 2019.

References

Laughlin
Laughlin
Buildings and structures in Pittsburgh
Demolished buildings and structures in Pennsylvania
Pennsylvania in the American Civil War
1863 establishments in Pennsylvania